Abu Sa'id al-Dharir al-Jurjani, also Gurgani, was a 9th-century Persian mathematician and astronomer from Gurgan (Jurjan), Iran.  He wrote a treatise on geometrical problems and another on the drawing of the meridian. George Sarton considers him a pupil of Ibn al-A'rabi, but Carl Brockelmann rejects this opinion.

Works
Two of his works are extant:
 Masa'il Hindisia (a manuscript is available in Cairo)
 Istikhraj khat nisf al-nahar min kitab analima wa al-borhan alayh (available in Cairo, translated by Carl Schoy)

See also
List of Iranian scientists

Sources

 H. Suter. Mathematiker (12, 1900).

845 deaths
9th-century Iranian mathematicians
Year of birth unknown
9th-century Iranian astronomers
Astronomers of the medieval Islamic world
People from Gorgan
Persian physicists